Expedition of Amr ibn al-As, also known as the Campaign of Dhatas Salasil, took place in September 629 AD, 8AH, 6th month, of the Islamic Calendar.

Background
After the retreat of the Muslim army at the Battle of Mu’tah, the Muslims decided to retaliate against tribes that had supported the Ghassanids in Mu'tah. The Banu Qudah were one such tribe, additionally there were rumours of them planning an attack on Medina itself. It is said Banu Qudah were motivated by Ghassanids and by some extend by the Byzantine elements themselves to attack Muslims area straight in their citadel, Medina Another reasons because Muslim spies has detected the Byzantines has incited their Arab tribe allies to attack Medina. This information was immediately sent to Medina, causing Muhammad to summon his council of Sahaba to decide how they should handle the matter.

Muhammad immediately appointed Amr ibn al-As, a new Muslim, to lead the expedition against the tribe of Banu Qudah. According to Sealed Nectar, Amr was chosen probably because he was related to Bali tribe, who were located in the area he was to carry out the operation.

The contingent consisted of 300 men and 30 horses with Amr ibn al-As as commander,. primary sources from Muslim contemporary chroniclers also stated the inclusion of famous Usama ibn Zayd, son of Zayd ibn Haritha who fell earlier in the battle of Mu'tah.Despite relative his young age, Usama already possessed battle experience, including from the battle of Mu'tah where his father died and later fought under command of Khalid ibn Al-Walid. Aside from huge portions Medina war veterans, Muhammad also enlisted some tribes who had already accepted to Islam and come to his aid in the event of great opposition.

Expedition
After Marching for 10 days, Amr ibn al-As encamped at a spring called Salasil, there he found that the enemy was assembled in large numbers, so he sent a messenger back to Muhammad asking for reinforcement. As a response, Muhammad sent 200 men, which included Abu Bakr and Umar, headed by Abu Ubaidah ibn al Jarrah.

When Abu Ubaidah arrived he asked to be the Commander of the entire force, to which Amr refused, Abu Ubaidah accepted this and does not complaint since he has been warned before by Muhammad not to enter any conflict over leadership during this expedition. This instruction included the ruling of who should command the prayer according to Fiqh or Islamic jurisprudence regarding the leader of daily prayer during the time of war. So it is agreed 'Amr should lead the prayer despite he still newly converted Muslim while Abu Ubaidah is veteran companion of Muhammad who had adhered Islamic teaching for long time

Preparation
after the Muslim army has reached the outskirt of the enemy encampments, 'Amr sending scouts. Soon 'Amr realized their enemy forces dwarved his forces by astronomical margin. Many accounts from surviving soldiers of Muslims stated that the enemy exceeding a hundred thousands. So 'Amr decided not to immediately launch the attack in daylight and instructed his soldiers to built encampment until night.

Battle
Under the cover of night after morning prayer, Amr ibn al-As launch a night raid at the enemy camp in the night while cloaking their own number.

'Amr also instructed his soldiers for each of two men to stay close together, they even instructed to tied their horses together so they cannot separated whatever happened during the combat. According to the Muslim scholar Saifur Rahman al-Mubarakpuri, causing most to flee, except one sub-tribe which fought.

This battle also recorded the famous narration from Usama ibn Zayd that has been chronicled by many Muslim historians & authentic Hadith narrator including Bukhari and Muslim. during the battle, Usama faced one particular enemy and immediately faced him one on one while Usama on his horse. Usama successfully dismantled his opponent sword. however, when Usama was about to kill the man, he suddenly plead for mercy. However, In the end Usama killed him
 

the raid was so successful and causing panic among the unprepared enemies. the less than five hundred Muslim warriors scored victory causing havoc among enemy camps without suffering single casualties before retreated along with some handsome spoils of war toward Medina.

Aftermath
Later after the Muslim army has been returned to Medina, Amr immediately reported to Muhammad there is personal commentary account from 'Amr himself who explained this strategy to Muhammad saying he instructed this because he want his men to fight in united stance under the cover of darkness of night, without being separated too far each others, so the enemy does not realized their numbers. 
Indeed, by fighting this way, the much numerous yet unprepared enemies are deceived to think they have been attacked by very large Muslim forces. which also now agreed by Umar who also participated in the battle

The incident regarding Usama also reported to Muhammad, then Usama became deeply lamented after he is strongly admonished by Muhammad regarding his conduct towards the surrendering enemy who has professed conversion to Islam.
 
It is said by Muslim scholars and historians including Ibn Hisham which was quoted on the commentary of Dr. Khalid Abdullah Zeed Basalamah Lc, M.A, during public lecture of one of the series of Seerah Nabawi or Prophetic biography book which released by Shaykh MahMud al-Mishri that 'Amr ibn al-Aas operation causing hostile Arabic clans which affiliated with Byzantine immediately aborted their intention to attack Medina due to realizing Medina capability to mount preemptive attack.

Islamic Primary sources

The Expedition is referenced in the Sunni hadith collection Sahih al-Bukhari as follows:

See also
Military career of Muhammad
List of expeditions of Muhammad

Notes

629
Campaigns ordered by Muhammad